Nimitz may refer to:

People
 Chester W. Nimitz (1885–1966), fleet admiral of the United States Navy
 Chester Nimitz Jr. (1915–2002), an American officer and submarine commander
 Jack Nimitz (1930–2009), American musician

Named for Fleet Admiral Nimitz
 USS Nimitz (CVN-68), a U.S. Navy supercarrier
 Nimitz-class aircraft carrier, a class of ten nuclear-powered aircraft carriers
 USS Nimitz UFO incident, a 2004 unexplained aerial phenomenon
 Nimitz High School (Harris County, Texas), Houston, Texas
 Nimitz High School (Irving, Texas)
 Nimitz Elementary School, Sunnyvale, California
 Nimitz Freeway, a designation of Interstate 880 in the San Francisco Bay Area 
 Nimitz Highway, a local name for Hawaii Route 92, a major east–west highway on the island of Oahu
 Nimitz, West Virginia
 Nimitz Glacier, an Antarctic glacier
 Nimitz Strike Group, a deployment of the U.S. Navy's Carrier Strike Group 11
 Admiral Nimitz Museum, a feature of the National Museum of the Pacific War in Fredericksburg, Texas
 Nimitz Class (novel), a 1997 naval thriller by Patrick Robinson
 Nimitz, the personal pet of the title character in David Weber's Honor Harrington military science fiction series

See also 
 Nimitz High School (disambiguation)
 Nimitz Hill (disambiguation)
 
 Niemitz (disambiguation)
 Nimtz
 Nemetz
 Němec
 Niemiec